Karuna Bhandari ( is a Nepali cricketer and a bowler of Nepali National Cricket team. She bats right handed and bowls right-arm off break. 

Bhandari played in the 2014 Asian Games as a part of the Nepal women's national cricket team. She also played in Women's T20 Qualifier's Asian Region. She was "player of the match" on the match with Kuwait in the ACC Women's Twenty20 Championship whom Nepal defeated and qualified to the semifinals.

In October 2021, she was named in Nepal's side for the 2021 ICC Women's T20 World Cup Asia Qualifier tournament in the United Arab Emirates.

References

Living people
1988 births
Nepalese women cricketers
Cricketers at the 2014 Asian Games
Asian Games competitors for Nepal
Nepal women Twenty20 International cricketers
South Asian Games bronze medalists for Nepal
South Asian Games medalists in cricket